Ernest is a borough in Indiana County, Pennsylvania, United States. The population was 422 at the 2020 census.

History
A post office called Ernest was established in 1903, and remained in operation until 1973. Ernest was the first coal town founded by the Rochester & Pittsburgh Coal Co. in Indiana County.  When  Adrian Iselin, the chief stockholder in the Rochester & Pittsburgh Coal & Iron Company, finished inspecting the new mine he officially changed the name from McKees Mills to Ernest, in honor of his son, who was born in 1876.

Geography

Demographics

As of the census of 2000, there were 501 people, 208 households, and 122 families residing in the borough. The population density was 2,134.6 people per square mile (841.0/km2). There were 221 housing units at an average density of 941.6 per square mile (371.0/km2). The racial makeup of the borough was 97.41% White, 1.00% African American, 0.40% Native American, 0.20% Asian, 0.40% from other races, and 0.60% from two or more races. Hispanic or Latino of any race were 0.80% of the population.

There were 208 households, out of which 30.8% had children under the age of 18 living with them, 43.3% were married couples living together, 10.6% had a female householder with no husband present, and 41.3% were non-families. 35.1% of all households were made up of individuals, and 23.6% had someone living alone who was 65 years of age or older. The average household size was 2.41 and the average family size was 3.18.

In the borough the population was spread out, with 26.9% under the age of 18, 8.4% from 18 to 24, 28.1% from 25 to 44, 19.6% from 45 to 64, and 17.0% who were 65 years of age or older. The median age was 36 years. For every 100 females there were 91.2 males. For every 100 females age 18 and over, there were 87.7 males.

The median income for a household in the borough was $21,058, and the median income for a family was $28,214. Males had a median income of $23,438 versus $17,125 for females. The per capita income for the borough was $10,951. About 16.7% of families and 19.8% of the population were below the poverty line, including 31.5% of those under age 18 and 15.9% of those age 65 or over.

Notable person
 Bernice Gera, first female umpire in a professional baseball game

References

Boroughs in Indiana County, Pennsylvania
1903 establishments in Pennsylvania